David Williams (born 20 May 1967) is a former professional rugby league footballer who played in the 1990s. He played at representative level for Wales.

International honours
Williams won caps for Wales while a Welsh student in 1995 against the United States (2 matches).

References

External links
United States of America 4 lost to Wales 92
United States of America 10 lost to Wales 66

1967 births
Living people
Footballers who switched code
Rugby league players
Wales national rugby league team players